Kasma Daniel bin Kasmayudin (born 2 September 2000), is a Malaysian motorcycle racer. He is currently competing in the ARRC Superbike 1000 category.

Career

He made his debut in the 2017 Moto3 season, as a wildcard in the 2017 Malaysian GP. He was also racing in FIM CEV Repsol in the same season.

During the 2019 season, Kasma Daniel raced in FIM CEV Repsol Moto2 for SIC Intact GP team partnering Matthias Meggle. On the same year, he also attended the VR46 Rider Academy Master Camp Training with Valentino Rossi in Italy.

Supersport Asia
Winner of 4 Series Cub Prix, Kasma Daniel dropped wildcard Supersport ARRC Sentul as this year's debut back in Asian racing. After stopping AP250 racing at ARRC 2016, Kasma is now competing in the FIM CEV Moto3 Junior World Championship.

Moto2 World Championship
Kasma Daniel was promoted to the FIM Moto2 World Championship with Onexox TKKR SAG Team in 2020 following a strong campaign in FIM CEV Repsol Moto2 the year prior. He was given a year-old spec Kalex machinery as his team struggled with financial issues. He finished the season with no points and registered the most crashes out of all world championship riders. 

Despite having a contract with SAG Team for 2021 following its rebranding to Pertamina Mandalika SAG Racing Team, his contract was terminated after the team opted to sign Bo Bendsneyder.

Asia Superbike 1000cc
After quitting Moto2, Kasma Daniel appeared in the 2022 Asia Road Racing Championship (ARRC). He went down in the Asia Superbike 1000cc (ASBK1000) class with Yamaha Asean Team riding a Yamaha YZF-R1M.

Career statistics

Grand Prix motorcycle racing

By season

By class

Races by year
(key) (Races in bold indicate pole position; races in italics indicate fastest lap)

Asia Superbike 1000

Races by year
(key) (Races in bold indicate pole position; races in italics indicate fastest lap)

References

External links

2000 births
Living people
People from Johor Bahru
Malaysian motorcycle racers
Moto3 World Championship riders
Moto2 World Championship riders